These are the full results of the athletics competition at the 2018 Central American and Caribbean Games which took place between 29 July and 2 August 2018 at Rafael Cotes Stadium in Barranquilla, Colombia.

Men's results

100 meters

Heats – July 29Wind:Heat 1: +2.4 m/s, Heat 2: -0.4 m/s, Heat 3: +2.7 m/s, Heat 4: +0.4 m/s

Semifinals – July 29Wind:Heat 1: +2.1 m/s, Heat 2: +0.5 m/s

Final – July 30Wind: +1.7 m/s

200 meters

Heats – July 31Wind:Heat 1: +0.6 m/s, Heat 2: +0.9 m/s, Heat 3: +0.7 m/s

Semifinals – July 31Wind:Heat 1: +0.3 m/s, Heat 2: +0.4 m/s

Final – August 1Wind: +0.9 m/s

400 meters

Heats – July 30

Final – August 1

800 meters

Heats – July 29

Final – July 30

1500 meters
August 1

5000 meters
July 31

10,000 meters
July 29

Marathon
August 3

110 meters hurdles

Heats – July 30Wind:Heat 1: +2.6 m/s, Heat 2: +1.9 m/s

Final – July 31Wind:+1.4 m/s

400 meters hurdles

Heats – July 29

Final – July 31

3000 meters steeplechase
August 2

4 × 100 meters relay
August 2

4 × 400 meters relay
August 2

20 kilometers walk
August 1

50 kilometers walk
August 1

High jump
August 1

Pole vault
August 2

Long jump
Jule 31

Triple jump
August 2

Shot put
July 30

Discus throw
July 29

Hammer throw
July 31

Javelin throw
August 2

Decathlon
July 29–30

Women's results

100 meters

Heats – July 29Wind:Heat 1: +2.2 m/s, Heat 2: +1.2 m/s, Heat 3: +2.9 m/s

Semifinals – July 29Wind:Heat 1: +1.5 m/s, Heat 2: +1.9 m/s

Final – July 30Wind: +2.3 m/s

200 meters

Heats – July 31Wind:Heat 1: +1.5 m/s, Heat 2: +0.8 m/s, Heat 3: +0.3 m/s

Semifinals – July 31Wind:Heat 1: +0.3 m/s, Heat 2: +0.4 m/s

Final – August 1Wind: +0.6 m/s

400 meters

Heats – July 30

Final – August 1

800 meters

Heats – July 29

Final – July 30

1500 meters
August 1

5000 meters
August 1

10,000 meters
July 29

Marathon
August 3

100 meters hurdles

Heats – July 30Wind:Heat 1: +2.8 m/s, Heat 2: +1.7 m/s

Final – July 31Wind:+1.5 m/s

400 meters hurdles

Heats – July 29

Final – July 31

3000 meters steeplechase
August 2

4 × 100 meters relay
August 2

4 × 400 meters relay
August 2

High jump
August 2

Pole vault
July 29

Long jump
Jule 30

Triple jump
August 1

Shot put
August 1

Discus throw
July 31

Hammer throw
July 29

Javelin throw
August 1

Heptathlon
July 31 – August 1

References

Central American and Caribbean Games
2018